Danil Andreyevich Pelikh (born 2 January 2001) is a Russian football player. He plays for FC Rotor Volgograd.

Club career
He made his debut in the Russian Professional Football League for FC Krasnodar-2 on 24 March 2018 in a game against FC Legion-Dynamo Makhachkala. He made his Russian Football National League debut for Krasnodar-2 on 10 November 2018 in a game against FC Tambov.

References

External links
 

2001 births
People from Bryukhovetsky District
Living people
Russian footballers
Russia youth international footballers
Association football defenders
FC Krasnodar players
FC Krasnodar-2 players
FC Rotor Volgograd players
Russian First League players
Russian Second League players
Sportspeople from Krasnodar Krai